is a Japanese figure skating coach and ISU technical specialist. He appeared as a men's singles skater during most of his competitive career, winning the national title in the 1994–1995 season. In 1997, he began a brief pairs career with Marie Arai. The pair placed 20th at the 1998 Winter Olympics in Nagano. They are the 1998 Japanese national champions.

Competitive highlights
GP: Champions Series (Grand Prix)

Men's singles

Pairs with Marie Arai

References 

1973 births
Living people
Japanese male pair skaters
Olympic figure skaters of Japan
Figure skaters at the 1998 Winter Olympics
International Skating Union technical specialists
Japanese male single skaters
Competitors at the 1997 Winter Universiade